Manmatha Nath High School better known as M.N High School, is a co-ed senior secondary Odiah medium school located in Pattamundai in District of Kendrapara, Odisha, India. The courses at high school levels are affiliated to the Board of Secondary Education, Odisha.

History
Conception : The establishment of a High School was first conceived by Late Surendranath Basu Ray, the then Superintendent of the "UTTIKANA" Estate. The Estate was allotted to Late Digambar Mitra in 1859. And his grand son was Late Manmath Nath Mitra. The Superintendent was the man to manage the day-to-day affairs of the estate and was a local resident of Patamundai in those days. The three sons of Late M N Mitra were the zamindars (jointly) of the estate.

Land Acquisition : The local personalities like Late Akuli Mishra of Baktarpur village, Late Gokul Chandra Verma, (Patamundai) and few other personalities had formed a society "Jana Mangala Samiti". After regular meetings and deliberations, they had influenced the Superintendent of the estate to establish the school. But the land was needed for the school. A delegation led by both the personalities had met the then zamindar brothers Late Kiran Kumar mitra, Late Bijay Kumar Mitra and Late Sanat Kumar Mitra to donate a piece of land for the school. And the three brothers also proposed to name the school in the name of their deceased father. And the delegation was happily agreed immediately to name the school as "Manamanth nath high School". But the land was not sufficient. Hence some land was also donated by persons like Late Damodar Tripathy, Late Pranakrishna Giri, Late Kunja Bihari Rout, Late Dinabandhu Choudhury, Late Harekrushna Choudhury and Late Chintamani Choudhury.

Activation : The school came into existence on 13/01/1944 at "Rabindra Medical Hall", presently the "Town Hall", which is adjacent to the present Pokhariapada U P School. The first Headmaster was Late Kanhu Charan Mishra of Baktarpur. The students appeared first High School Certificate Examination in 1947 under the Utkal University, Bhubaneswar.

Campus & Facilities
The school is on an area of 5.13 acres of land, near Patamundai, on the road connecting Kendrapara and Rajanagar in the eastern part of the city. It is 21 km from the Bhitarkanika National Park,1.5 km from main town. It has adequate number of Classrooms, Library and a Science Laboratory. with a spacious Football field in front of the school. The school is well protected with boundary. It has hostel accommodation also. Once it was functional and more than 50 students were availing the facility.availing the facility.

M.N High School has 21 (Twenty One) teaching staffs and 5 (Five) non teaching staffs. The total student strength in the school is 715. Every year there is an increase of intake strength of students up to 15–25 per batch. The student-teacher ratio is 1:34.

M.N High School has a small well stocked botanical garden and a small sports complex. It attracts students from almost all parts of the district, it is known as best school in Kendrapara district and one of the best school of the state. The school is famous for producing quality students who have successfully established themselves in various government and non-government organisation and consistently working for development of the state.

Co-curricular activities 
Students participate in activities that enhances their skill in the field of education. They participate in Odia Debate, Odia Poem Recitation, and many more. NCC and Scouts is also there in the School.

Learning aids 
The school has a library of over 3,000 books. It subscribes to over 30 magazines and periodicals of educational and literary nature.
Internet access is available to the students in the computer laboratory.

School uniform
The school uniform consists of:
 White shirt
 Blue shorts or long pants or skirts for girls
 Red tie
 Black shoes and white socks
 Red sweater(winter)

Prayers
Prayer before Class Famous prayer which is sung in every vernacular school in Odisha.

Notable Guru of the Institution

This school has eminent teachers, who has been recognised by the society and had illustrious records.

Late Biswanath Mishra, B.A, B.Ed; S/o - Late Maheswar Mishra, Village - Nuagaon Sasan, Patamundai. He was Headmaster of the High School from 1949 till his retirement in 1969, when the school was taken over by the Government. He is the recipient of the State Award in 1964 and later President's Gold Medal for excellence in teaching in 1967 from the President of India Sarvepalli Radhakrishnan.
Late Paramananda Khandai, Matric, C.T, S/o - Late Suryamani Khndai, Village - Gobindapur, Patamundai. He was Assistant Teacher of the High School from 1948 till his death on 20/07/1967. He has published numerous books in almost all subjects, which were recognised as text book for most of the Primary and M.E. Classes all over Odisha. He has visited almost all such schools to publicise his books. He is also recipient of the State Award in 1964.
Late Binod Behari Dash, S/o - Late Padmanava Dash, Vill - Madhyakhandi, Kendrapada. He was an Assistant Teacher of "Board Middle English School" at Patamundai. As the said school was merged with the M N High School, he joined the High School in 1948 and was associated with the High School till retirement in 1969. He was recipient of the State Award in 1966. He had unique recognition to be teacher of three generation of many families. His common dialogue to many was " I am your father's teacher, I am teaching you and I hope, I will teach your son." And he was so popular in Patamundai region that many dispute were resolved amicably without any legal interventions. He was just consulted for any marriage proposals and his opinions had concluded many marriage proposals. He was considered to be a universal judge in many family disputes till is death on 27 December 1985. He was so  much attached to this area that he was not read to leave Pattamundai even after his retirement in 1969. With great difficulty, his sons were able to persuade him to leave Pattamundai after many years.
 Sri Sanatan Beura, Matric C.T., S/o - Late Nidhiram Behura born at Firiki Dandi, Rajnagar, currently settled at Village - Praharajpur, Patamundai. He was student of 5th batch of this High School and was Assistant teacher of this High School from 1965 (after serving the schools at Choudakulat, Indupur, Rajkanika) till his retirement in 1991. He was transferred to the JaiHind High School, Dandisahi, twice for about a year or two, in between. He is the recipient of the State Award in 1990. His stories and poems were published in many local dailies and periodicals.
Smt Aradhana Dash, Village - Dakhindia, Patamundai, Assistant Teacher of the High School is recipient of the State Award in 2017 and currently in service. She is presently Headmistress in charge of the High school.

See also

 Pattamundai
 Kendrapara
 Bhitarkanika National Park
 Laxmi Baraha Jew Temple
 Brahmani River

References

 Golden Jubilee Souvenir 1994, 
 Diamond Jubilee Souvenir 2010
 Sri Sanatan Beura, Old student (5th Batch), Ex-Assistant Teacher of the High School

High schools and secondary schools in Odisha
Co-educational schools in India
Kendrapara district
Schools in Odisha
1944 establishments in India
Educational institutions established in 1944